These are the Official Charts Company's UK Dance Chart number-one albums of 2008. The dates listed in the menus below represent the Saturday after the Sunday the chart was announced, as per the way the dates are given in chart publications such as the ones produced by Billboard, Guinness, and Virgin.

Chart history

Notes

On Issue date 27 September and 4 October The Coral was listed as number one with the album Singles Collection even through they are of an indie rock genre not even close to electronic.

See also
List of number-one albums of 2008 (UK)
List of UK Dance Chart number-one singles of 2008
List of UK R&B Chart number-one albums of 2008

References

External links
Dance Albums Chart at the Official Charts Company
UK Top 40 Dance Album Chart at BBC Radio 1

2008
Number-one dance albums
United Kingdom Dance Albums